Joël Kiki N'Gako Nyobu (born 21 October 1985 in Cameroon) is a French retired footballer.

Career

After failing to make an appearance for French Ligue 1 side Toulouse and Porto, one of the most successful Portuguese teams, N'Gako played signed for OFC Belasitsa Petrich in Bulgaria. He played for the club during the 2006 A PFG season, before joining German fourth division club Oberneuland.

For 2010, he signed for Vera Cruz Futebol Clube to play in the Pernambucano state championship.  He was the first foreign footballer signed in the club's 50 years of existence.

For 2011, he signed for another Brazilian outfit, Associação Acadêmica e Desportiva Vitória das Tabocas.

For the second half of 2011/12, N'Gako signed for Costuleni in the Moldovan top flight, where he made 6 league appearances. After that, he played in the French fifth division for Toulouse Rodéo.

References

External links
Joël Kiki N'Gako at Soccerway

Association football defenders
French footballers
1985 births
Living people
Cameroonian footballers
FC Costuleni players
Toulouse Rodéo FC players
FC Oberneuland players